Montmoreau is a commune in the department of Charente, southwestern France. The municipality was established on 1 January 2017 by merger of the former communes of Montmoreau-Saint-Cybard (the seat), Aignes-et-Puypéroux, Saint-Amant-de-Montmoreau, Saint-Eutrope and Saint-Laurent-de-Belzagot.

Population

See also 
Communes of the Charente department

References 

Communes of Charente

Communes nouvelles of Charente
Populated places established in 2017
2017 establishments in France